Marie-Reine de Jaham (born February 7, 1940) is a Martiniquais-born writer living in France.

At the age of 17, she married and moved with her husband to the United States. There, she began a career in advertising in New York City; she later moved to Paris, where she founded her own agency. In 1990, she established a Creole cultural association, Le Patrimoine Créole. She is considered one of the best-informed experts on Creole culture. de Jaham moved to Nice in 2000. There, she established the Cercle Méditerranée Caraïbe with the aim of establishing links between the Mediterranean region and the Caribbean.

In 1989, she published her first novel La Grande Béké, which became a bestseller and was adapted for television in 1998. In 1991, she published a second novel Le Maître-savane which continued the story begun in her first novel.

In 1996, de Jaham was named a Chevalier in the French Ordre des Arts et des Lettres. She was promoted officer in january 2013

Selected works 
 Les desserts créoles et leur complice le sucre de canne, cook book (1992)
 L’Or des îles (1996), Le Sang du volcan (1997), Les Héritiers du paradis. (1998): trilogy, the first volume received the Prix Arc-en-ciel and the first two volumes received the Prix littéraire des Caraïbes from the 
 Bwa bandé, novel (1999)
 Le Sortilège des marassa, novel (2001)
 La cuisine créole de Da Doudou, cook book (2004)
 La Véranda créole, novel (2005)
 a Caravelle Liberté, novel (2007)

References

External links 
 

1940 births
Living people
Martiniquais writers
Martiniquais women writers
Chevaliers of the Ordre des Arts et des Lettres